Cunningham Hill is a former town in Beaver County, Utah. The GNIS classifies it as a populated place.

The community bears the name of Cunningham Matthews, a pioneer who settled there.

References

Ghost towns in Beaver County, Utah
Ghost towns in Utah